RAF Bomber Command controlled the Royal Air Force's bomber forces from 1936 to 1968. Along with the United States Army Air Forces, it played the central role in the strategic bombing of Germany in World War II. From 1942 onward, the British bombing campaign against Germany became less restrictive and increasingly targeted industrial sites and the civilian manpower base essential for German war production. In total 364,514 operational sorties were flown, 1,030,500 tons of bombs were dropped and 8,325 aircraft lost in action. Bomber Command crews also suffered a high casualty rate: 55,573 were killed out of a total of 125,000 aircrew, a 44.4% death rate. A further 8,403 men were wounded in action, and 9,838 became prisoners of war.

Bomber Command stood at the peak of its post-war military power in the 1960s, the V bombers holding the United Kingdom's nuclear deterrent and a supplemental force of Canberra light bombers.

In August 2006, a memorial was unveiled at Lincoln Cathedral. A memorial in Green Park in London was unveiled by Queen Elizabeth II on 28 June 2012 to highlight the price paid by the aircrews. In April 2018 The International Bomber Command Centre was opened in Lincoln.

Background
At the time of the formation of Bomber Command in 1936, Giulio Douhet's slogan "the bomber will always get through" was popular, and figures like Stanley Baldwin cited it. Until advances in radar technology in the late 1930s, this statement was effectively true. Attacking bombers could not be detected early enough to assemble fighters fast enough to prevent them reaching their targets. Some damage might be done to the bombers by AA guns, and by fighters as the bombers returned to base, but that was not as effective as a proper defence. Consequently, the early conception of Bomber Command was as an entity that threatened the enemy with utter destruction, and thus prevented war.

In 1936, Germany's increasing air power was feared by British government planners who commonly overestimated its size, reach and hitting power. Planners used estimates of up to 72 British deaths per tonne of bombs dropped, though this figure was grossly exaggerated. As well, the planners did not know that German bombing aircraft of the day (not quite 300 Junkers Ju 52 medium bombers) did not have the range to reach the UK with a load of bombs and return to the mainland. British air officers did nothing to correct these perceptions because they could see the usefulness of having a strong bombing arm.

Early years of the Second World War

At the start of the Second World War in 1939, Bomber Command faced four problems. The first was lack of size; Bomber Command was not large enough effectively to operate as an independent strategic force. The second was rules of engagement; at the start of the war, the targets allocated to Bomber Command were not wide enough in scope. The third problem was the Command's lack of technology; specifically radio or radar derived navigational aids to allow accurate target location at night or through cloud. (In 1938, E. G. "Taffy" Bowen proposed using ASV radar for navigation, only to have Bomber Command disclaim need for it, saying the sextant was sufficient. ) The fourth problem was the limited accuracy of bombing, especially from high level, even when the target could be seen by the bomb aimer.

When the war began on 1 September 1939, Franklin D. Roosevelt, President of the neutral United States, issued an appeal to the major belligerents to confine their air raids to military targets. The French and British agreed to abide by the request, provided "that these same rules of warfare will be scrupulously observed by all of their opponents". British policy was to restrict bombing to military targets and infrastructure, such as ports and railways which were of military importance. While acknowledging that bombing Germany would cause civilian casualties, the British government renounced deliberate bombing of civilian property (outside combat zones) as a military tactic. The British abandoned this policy at the end of the "Phoney War", or Sitzkrieg, on 15 May 1940, one day after the Rotterdam Blitz.

The British government did not want to violate its agreement by attacking civilian targets outside combat zones and the French were even more concerned lest Bomber Command operations provoke a German bombing attack on France. Since the Armée de l'Air had few modern fighters and no defence network comparable to the British Chain Home radar stations, this left France powerless before the threat of a German bombing attack. The final problem was lack of adequate aircraft. The Bomber Command workhorses at the start of the war, the Vickers Wellington, Armstrong Whitworth Whitley and Handley Page Hampden/Hereford, had been designed as tactical-support medium bombers and none of them had enough range or ordnance capacity for anything more than a limited strategic offensive.

Bomber Command became even smaller after the declaration of war. No. 1 Group, with its squadrons of Fairey Battles, left for France to form the Advanced Air Striking Force. This action had two aims: to give the British Expeditionary Force some air-striking power and to allow the Battles to operate against German targets, since they lacked the range to do so from British airfields.

In May 1940, some of the Advanced Air Striking Force was caught on the ground by German air attacks on their airfields at the opening of the invasion of France. The remainder of the Battles proved to be horrendously vulnerable to enemy fire. Many times, Battles would set out to attack and be almost wiped out in the process. Due to French paranoia about being attacked by German aircraft during the Phoney War, the Battle force had actually trained over German airspace at night.

Following the Rotterdam Blitz of 14 May, RAF Bomber Command was authorized to attack German targets east of the Rhine on 15 May; the Air Ministry authorized Air Marshal Charles Portal to attack targets in the Ruhr, including oil plants and other civilian industrial targets which aided the German war effort, such as blast furnaces (which were visible at night). The first attack took place on the night of 15/16 May, with 96 bombers setting off to attack targets east of the Rhine, 78 of which were against oil targets. Of these, only 24 claimed to have found their targets.

Bomber Command itself soon fully joined in the action; in the Battle of Britain, Bomber Command was assigned to bomb invasion barges and fleets assembling in the Channel ports. This was much less public than the battles of the Spitfires and Hurricanes of RAF Fighter Command but still vital and dangerous work. From July 1940 to the end of the year, Bomber Command lost nearly 330 aircraft and over 1,400 aircrew killed, missing or captured.

Bomber Command was also indirectly responsible, in part at least, for the switch of Luftwaffe attention away from Fighter Command to bombing civilian targets. A German bomber on a raid got lost due to poor navigation and bombed London. Prime Minister Winston Churchill consequently ordered a retaliatory raid on the German capital of Berlin. The damage caused was minor but the raid sent Hitler into a rage. He ordered the Luftwaffe to level British cities, thus precipitating the Blitz.

Like the United States Army Air Forces later in the war, Bomber Command had first concentrated on a doctrine of "precision" bombing in daylight. When the German defences inflicted costly defeats on British raids in late 1939, a switch to night bombing was forced upon the Command. The problems of enemy defences were then replaced with the problems of night navigation and target-finding. It was common in the early years of the war for bombers relying on dead reckoning navigation to miss entire cities. Surveys of bombing photographs and other sources published during August 1941, indicated that fewer than one bomb in ten fell within  of its intended target. One of the most urgent problems of the Command was thus to develop navigational aids.

Organisation
Bomber Command comprised a number of Groups. It began the war with Nos. 1, 2, 3, 4 and 5 Groups. No. 1 Group was soon sent to France and then returned to Bomber Command control after the evacuation of France. No. 2 Group consisted of light and medium bombers who, although operating both by day and night, remained part of Bomber Command until 1943, when it was removed to the control of Second Tactical Air Force, to form the light bomber component of that command. Bomber Command also gained two new groups during the war: the Royal Canadian Air Force (RCAF) squadrons were organised into No. 6 Group and the Pathfinder Force was expanded to form No. 8 (Pathfinder) Group from existing squadrons.

Many squadrons and personnel from Commonwealth and other European countries flew in Bomber Command. No. 6 Group, which was activated on 1 January 1943, was unique among Bomber Command groups, in that it was not an RAF unit; it was a Canadian unit attached to Bomber Command. At its peak strength, 6 Group consisted of 14 operational RCAF bomber squadrons and 15 squadrons served with the group. No. 8 Group, also known as the Pathfinder Force, was activated on 15 August 1942. It was a critical part of solving the navigational and aiming problems experienced. Bomber Command solved its navigational problems using two methods. One was the use of a range of increasingly sophisticated electronic aids to navigation and the other was the use of specialist Pathfinders. The technical aids to navigation took two forms. One was external radio navigation aids, as exemplified by Gee and the later highly accurate Oboe systems. The other was the centimetric navigation equipment H2S radar carried in the bombers. The Pathfinders were a group of elite, specially trained and experienced crews who flew ahead and with the main bombing forces and marked the targets with flares and special marker-bombs. No. 8 Group controlled the Pathfinder squadrons.

A number of other groups were part of the command, including, in June 1944, No. 26 Group RAF, three operational training groups - No. 91 Group RAF at Morton Hall, Swinderby, which was merged into No. 21 Group RAF, part of RAF Flying Training Command, on 1 May 1947; Nos 92 and 93 Groups; and No. 100 Group RAF (of which last was responsible for development, operational trial and use of electronic warfare and countermeasures equipment).

Strategic bombing 1942–1945

In 1941, the Butt Report revealed the extent of bombing inaccuracy: Churchill noted that "this is a very serious paper and seems to require urgent attention". The Area Bombing Directive of 14 February 1942 ordered Bomber Command to target German industrial areas and the "morale of...the industrial workers". The directive also reversed the order of the previous year instructing Bomber Command to conserve its forces; this resulted in a large campaign of area bombardment against the Ruhr area. Professor Frederick Lindemann's "de-housing" paper of March identified the expected effectiveness of attacks on residential and general industrial areas of cities. The aerial bombing of cities such as the Operation Millennium raid on Cologne continued throughout the rest of the war, culminating in the controversial bombing of Dresden in 1945.

In 1942, the main workhorse-aircraft of the later part of the war came into service: the four-engined heavies. The Halifax and Lancaster made up the backbone of the Command; they had a longer range, higher speed and much greater bomb load than earlier aircraft. The older four-engined Short Stirling and twin-engined Vickers Wellington bombers were not taken out of service, but moved to less demanding tasks such as mine-laying. The classic aircraft of the Pathfinders, the de Havilland Mosquito, also made its appearance. By 25 July 1943, the Bomber Command headquarters had come to occupy "a substantial set of red brick buildings, hidden in the middle of a forest on top of a hill in the English county of Buckinghamshire".

An offensive against the Rhine-Ruhr area ("Happy Valley" to aircrew) began on the night of 5/6 March 1943, with the first raid of the Battle of the Ruhr on Essen. The bombers destroyed  of the city and hit 53 Krupps buildings. The Battle of Hamburg in mid-1943 was one of the most successful Bomber Command operations, although Harris' extension of the offensive into the Battle of Berlin failed to destroy the capital and cost his force more than 1,000 crews in the winter of 1943–44.  In August 1943, Operation Hydra, the bombing of the Peenemünde V-2 rocket facility opened the secondary Operation Crossbow campaign against long-range weapons.

By April 1944, Harris was forced to reduce his strategic offensive as the bomber force was directed (much to his annoyance) to tactical and transport targets in France in support of the invasion of Normandy. The transport offensive proved highly effective. By late 1944, bombing such as Operation Hurricane (to demonstrate the capabilities of the combined British and US bomber forces), competed against the German defences. Bomber Command was now capable of putting 1,000 aircraft over a target without extraordinary efforts. Within 24 hours of Operation Hurricane, the RAF dropped about 10,000 tonnes of bombs on Duisburg and Brunswick, the greatest bomb load dropped in a day during the Second World War.

The peak of Bomber Command operations occurred in the raids of March 1945, when its squadrons dropped the greatest weight of bombs for any month in the war. Wesel in the Rhineland, bombed on 16, 17, 18 and 19 February, was bombed again on 23 March, leaving the city "97 percent destroyed".  The last raid on Berlin took place on the night of 21/22 April, when 76 Mosquitos made six attacks just before Soviet forces entered the city centre. By this point, most RAF bombing operations were for the purpose of providing tactical support. The last major strategic raid was the destruction of the oil refinery at Vallø (Tønsberg) in southern Norway by 107 Lancasters, on the night of 25/26 April.

Once the surrender of Germany had occurred, plans were made to send a "Very Long Range Bomber Force" known as Tiger Force to participate in the Pacific war against Japan. Made up of about 30 British Commonwealth heavy bomber squadrons, a reduction of the original plan of about 1,000 aircraft, the British bombing component was intended to be based on Okinawa. Bomber Command groups were re-organised for Operation Downfall but the Soviet invasion of Manchuria and the Bombing of Hiroshima and Nagasaki occurred before the force had been transferred to the Pacific.

In Europe Bomber Command's final operation was to fly released Allied prisoners of war home to Britain in Operation Exodus.

Casualties

Bomber Command crews suffered an extremely high casualty rate: 55,573 killed out of a total of 125,000 aircrew (a 44.4 per cent death rate), a further 8,403 were wounded in action and 9,838 became prisoners of war. This covered all Bomber Command operations.

A Bomber Command crew member had a worse chance of survival than an infantry officer in World War I; more people were killed serving in Bomber Command than in the Blitz, or the bombings of Hamburg or Dresden. By comparison, the US Eighth Air Force, which flew daylight raids over Europe, had 350,000 aircrew during the war and suffered 26,000 killed and 23,000 POWs. Of the RAF Bomber Command personnel killed during the war, 72 per cent were British, 18 per cent were Canadian, 7 per cent were Australian and 3 per cent were New Zealanders.

Taking an example of 100 airmen:
 55 killed on operations or died as a result of wounds
 three injured (in varying levels of severity) on operations or active service
 12 taken prisoner of war (some wounded)
 two shot down and evaded capture
 27 survived a tour of operations

In total 364,514 operational sorties were flown, 1,030,500 tons of bombs were dropped and 8,325 aircraft lost in action.

Harris was advised by an Operational Research Section (ORS-BC) under a civilian, Basil Dickins, supported by a small team of mathematicians and scientists. ORS-BC (under Reuben Smeed) was concerned with analysing bomber losses. They were able to influence operations by identifying successful defensive tactics and equipment, though some of their more controversial advice (such as removing ineffectual turrets from bombers to increase speed) was ignored.

The very high casualties suffered give testimony to the dedication and courage of Bomber Command aircrew in carrying out their orders. The overall loss rate for Bomber Command operations was 2.2 per cent, but loss rates over Germany were significantly higher; from November 1943 – March 1944, losses averaged 5.1 per cent. The highest loss rate (11.8 per cent) was incurred on the Nuremberg raid (30 March 1944). The disparity in loss rates was reflected in that, at times, Bomber Command considered making sorties over France only count as a third of an op towards the "tour" total and crews derisively referred to officers who only chose to fly on the less dangerous ops to France as "François". The loss rates excluded aircraft crashing in the UK on return, even if the machine was a write-off and there were crew casualties, which amounted to at least another 15 percent. Losses in training were significant and some courses lost 25 per cent of their intake before graduation; 5,327 men were killed in training from 1939 to 1945.

RAF Bomber Command had 19 Victoria Cross recipients.

Effectiveness of operations

Albert Speer, Hitler's Minister of Armaments, noted that the larger British bombs were highly destructive. 15 years after the war's end, Speer was unequivocal about the effect,

In terms of production decrease resulting from the RAF area attacks, the US survey, based upon limited research, found that in 1943 it amounted to 9 per cent and in 1944 to 17 per cent. Relying on US gathered statistics, the British survey found that actual arms production decreases were a mere 3 per cent for 1943, and 1 per cent for 1944. However they did find decreases of 46.5 per cent and 39 per cent in the second half of 1943 and 1944 respectively in the metal processing industries. These losses resulted from the devastating series of raids the Command launched on the Ruhr Valley. A contrasting view was offered by Adam Tooze that by referring to contemporary sources rather than post-war accounts:

and that in the first quarter of 1943 steel production fell by 200,000 tons, leading to cuts in the German ammunition production programme and a Zulieferungskrise (sub-components crisis). German aircraft output did not increase between July 1943 and March 1944:

The greatest contribution to winning the war made by Bomber Command was in the huge diversion of German resources into defending the homeland. By January 1943 some 1,000 Luftwaffe night fighters were committed to the defence of the Reich; mostly twin engined Bf 110 and Ju 88. Most critically, by September 1943, 8,876 of the deadly, dual purpose 88 mm guns were also defending the homeland with a further 25,000 light flak guns, 20/37 mm. Though the 88mm gun was an effective AA weapon, it was also a deadly destroyer of tanks, and lethal against advancing infantry. These weapons would have done much to augment German anti-tank defences on the Russian front.

1946–1968
Bomber Command acquired B-29 Superfortresses, known to the RAF as Boeing Washingtons, to supplement the Avro Lincoln, a development of the Lancaster. The first jet bomber, the English Electric Canberra light bomber, became operational in 1951. Some Canberras remained in RAF service up to 2006 as photo-reconnaissance aircraft. The model proved an extremely successful aircraft; Britain exported it to many countries and licensed it for construction in Australia and the United States. The joint US-UK Project E was intended to make nuclear weapons available to Bomber Command in an emergency, with the Canberras the first aircraft to benefit. The next jet bomber to enter service was the Vickers Valiant in 1955, the first of the V bombers.

The Air Ministry conceived of the V bombers as the replacement for the wartime Lancasters and Halifaxes.  Three advanced aircraft were developed from 1946, along with the Short Sperrin fall-back design. Multiple designs were tried out because no one could predict which designs would be successful at the time. The V bombers became the backbone of the British nuclear forces and comprised the Valiant, Handley Page Victor (in service in 1958) and Avro Vulcan (1956).

In 1956 Bomber Command faced its first operational test since the Second World War. The Egyptian Government nationalised the Suez Canal in July 1956, and British troops took part in an invasion along with French and Israeli forces. During the Suez Crisis, Britain deployed Bomber Command Canberras to Cyprus and Malta and Valiants to Malta. The Canberra performed well but the Valiant had problems, since it had only just been introduced into service. The Canberras proved vulnerable to attack by the Egyptian Air Force, which fortunately did not choose to attack the crowded airfields of Cyprus (RAF Akrotiri and RAF Nicosia holding nearly the whole RAF strike force, with a recently reactivated and poor-quality airfield taking much of the French force). Over 100 Bomber Command aircraft took part in operations against Egypt. By Second World War standards, the scale of attack was light.

Between 1959 and 1963, in addition to manned aircraft, Bomber Command also gained 60 Thor nuclear intermediate-range ballistic missiles dispersed to 20 RAF stations around Britain in a joint UK-US operation known as Project Emily. During the following twelve years, Bomber Command aircraft frequently deployed overseas to the Far East and Middle East. They served particularly as a deterrent to Sukarno's Indonesia during the Konfrontasi. A detachment of Canberras had a permanent base at Akrotiri in Cyprus in support of CENTO obligations.

Britain tested its first atomic bomb in 1952 and exploded its first hydrogen bomb in 1957. Operation Grapple saw Valiant bombers testing the dropping of hydrogen bombs over Christmas Island.  Advances in electronic countermeasures were also applied to the V bombers over the same period and the remaining V bombers came into service in the late 1950s. During the Cuban Missile Crisis of October 1962, Bomber Command aircraft maintained continuous strip alerts, ready to take off at a moment's notice, and the Thor missiles were maintained at advanced readiness. The Prime Minister did not disperse Bomber Command aircraft to satellite airfields, lest that be viewed as an aggressive step.

By the early 1960s doubts emerged about the ability of Bomber Command to pierce the defences of the Soviet Union. The shooting down of a U-2 spyplane in 1960 confirmed that the Soviet Union did have surface-to-air missiles capable of reaching the heights at which bombers operated. Since the Second World War the philosophy of bombing had involved going higher and faster. With the supersession of high and fast tactics, ultra-low-level attack was substituted. Bomber Command aircraft had not been designed for that kind of attack, and airframe fatigue increased. All Valiants were grounded in October 1964 and permanently withdrawn from service in January 1965. Low-level operations also reduced the lifespan of the Victors and Vulcans.

Bomber Command's other main function was to provide tanker aircraft to the RAF. The Valiant was the first bomber used as a tanker operationally. As high-level penetration declined as an attack technique, the Valiant saw more and more use as a tanker until the retirement of the type in 1965 due to the costs of remediating metal fatigue. With the Victor also unsuited to the low-level role six were converted to tankers to replace the Valiants, before the later conversion of the majority of Victors to tankers. The Vulcan also saw service as a tanker, but only in an improvised conversion during the Falklands War of 1982. Ironically, in the tanker role, the Victor not only outlived Bomber Command, but also all the other V bombers by nine years.

In a further attempt to make the operation of the bomber force safer, attempts were made to develop stand-off weapons, with which capability the bombers would not have to penetrate Soviet airspace. However, efforts to do so had only limited success. The first attempt involved the Blue Steel missile (in service: 1963–1970). It worked, but its range meant that bombers still had to enter Soviet airspace. Longer-range systems were developed, but failed and/or were cancelled. This fate befell the Mark 2 of the Blue Steel, its replacement, the American Skybolt ALBM and the ground-based Blue Streak programme.

However, attempts to develop a stand-off nuclear deterrent eventually succeeded. Britain procured American Polaris missiles and built Royal Navy submarines to carry them. The modern form of the British nuclear force was thus essentially reached. Royal Navy submarines relieved the RAF of the nuclear deterrent mission in 1969, but by that point, Bomber Command no longer existed.

RAF Fighter Command and Bomber Command merged in 1968 to form Strike Command. RAF Coastal Command followed in November 1969.

Bomber Command took time to attain full effectiveness in the Second World War, but with the development of better navigation and aircraft it proved highly destructive. The massed attacks of Bomber Command and the US Eighth Air Force compelled Germany to devote considerable resources to air defence instead of pursuing its primary war aims. Postwar, it carried Britain's nuclear deterrent through a difficult period.

Air Officer Commanding-in-Chief
At any one time several air officers served on the staff of Bomber Command and so the overall commander was known as the Air Officer Commanding-in-Chief, the most well-known being Air Chief Marshal Sir Arthur Harris.  The Air Officer Commanding-in-Chief are listed below with the rank which they held whilst in post.

Battle honours
 "Berlin 1940–1945": For bombardment of Berlin by aircraft of Bomber Command.
 "Fortress Europe 1940–1944": For operations by aircraft based in the British Isles against targets in Germany, Italy and enemy-occupied Europe, from the fall of France to the invasion of Normandy.

Memorials

Singer Robin Gibb led an effort to commemorate those who lost their lives during World War II and in April, 2011, it was announced that the £5.6 million needed to build the memorial had been raised. The foundation stone of the Bomber Command Memorial for the crews of Bomber Command was laid in Green Park, London on 4 May 2011.

The memorial was designed by architect Liam O'Connor, who was also responsible for the design and construction of the Commonwealth Memorial Gates on Constitution Hill, near Buckingham Palace. Sculptor Philip Jackson created the large bronze sculpture which stands within the memorial. Jackson described the sculpture as capturing "the moment when they get off the aircraft and they've dumped all their heavy kit onto the ground".
The memorial was dedicated and unveiled on 28 June 2012 by Queen Elizabeth II.

The International Bomber Command Centre (IBCC) is a memorial and interpretation centre telling the story of Bomber Command. The centre was opened to the public at the end of January 2018, and the official opening ceremony was held on 12 April 2018, as part of the 100th anniversary celebrations of the RAF.  The memorial itself consists of a Memorial Spire and an array of walls listing the names of the 57,861 personnel who died in Bomber Command in the Second World War.

Medal clasp and proposed medal 
The planned campaign medal for Bomber Command was never struck. The decision not to award a medal for all members of Bomber Command occurred during the short gap between the wartime coalition and Attlee's Labour Government, whilst Churchill was still P.M. This caused Harris to turn down Attlee's subsequent offer of a peerage in protest at this snub; a principled stand which Harris had taken, and declared, at the time the decision not to award a separate campaign medal was made. The Command's raids had tied up huge amounts of Germany's defensive resources - which might have been diverted to the Eastern and Western Fronts and elsewhere - and the physical destruction of war material was considerable. Nevertheless, Churchill, much to Harris's chagrin, made virtually no mention of Bomber Command's campaign in his victory speech on V.E.day. Harris, who was promoted to Marshal of the RAF by the Labour Government in 1946, was persuaded to accept a baronetcy when Winston Churchill became Prime Minister again in 1951, after Attlee's Labour Government was voted out of office. As of 2018, the battle for a campaign medal continues.

The Military Medals Review was undertaken by Sir John Holmes and published in July 2012. In December 2012, following the review, the British government announced the introduction of a "Bomber Command" clasp to be worn on the 1939–1945 Star. The second such clasp after the "Battle of Britain" which had been instituted in 1945. A clasp rather than a separate medal was preferred because recipients would have already received either the Air Crew Europe Star or the France and Germany Star, and a specific medal would have resulted in “double-medalling”. It is a long-standing principle of the British honours system that "same individual should not be able to receive two campaign medals for the same element of military service"; i.e. double-medalling. The eligibility for the "Bomber Command" clasp is as follows: having already qualified for the 1939–1945 Star, the individual must have served for at least sixty days or one complete tour of operations on a Bomber Command unit and flew at least one operational sortie on a Bomber Command operational unit from the 3 September 1939 to the 8 May 1945 inclusive.

See also
 112 Signals Unit Stornoway
 G for George
 International Bomber Command Centre
 RAF Bomber Command aircrew of World War II
 Target for Tonight
 List of Royal Air Force commands

References

Explanatory notes

Citations

Bibliography

 Bishop, Patrick. Bomber Boys – Fighting Back 1940–1945. .
 Carter, Ian. Bomber Command 1939–1945. .
 Don Charlwood No Moon Tonight. .
 Childers, Thomas. "'Facilis descensus averni est': The Allied Bombing of Germany and the Issue of German Suffering", Central European History Vol. 38, No. 1 (2005), pp. 75–105 in JSTOR
 Garrett, Stephen A. Ethics and Airpower in World War II: The British Bombing of German Cities (1993)
 Halpenny, Bruce Barrymore. Action Stations: Military Airfields of Yorkshire v. 4. .
 Falconer, Jonathan. Bomber Command Handbook 1939–1945. Sutton Publishing Limited. .
 
 Halpenny, Bruce Barrymore. Action Stations: Wartime Military Airfields of Lincolnshire and the East Midlands v. 2. .
 Halpenny, Bruce Barrymore. Bomber Aircrew of World War II: True Stories of Frontline Air Combat. .
 Halpenny, Bruce Barrymore. English Electric Canberra: The History and Development of a Classic Jet. Pen & Sword, 2005. .
 Halpenny, Bruce Barrymore. To Shatter the Sky: Bomber Airfield at War. .
 Harris, Arthur. Despatch on War Operations (Cass Studies in Air Power). .
 Hastings, Max (1979). RAF Bomber Command. Pan Books. 
 Koch, H. W. "The Strategic Air Offensive against Germany: the Early Phase, May–September 1940." The Historical Journal, 34 (March 1991) pp 117–41. online at JSTOR
 Lammers, Stephen E. "William Temple and the bombing of Germany: an Exploration in the Just War Tradition." Journal of Religious Ethics, 19 (Spring 1991): 71–93. Explains how the Archbishop of Canterbury justified strategic bombing.
 Messenger, Charles. Bomber Harris and the Strategic Bombing Offensive, 1939–1945. London: Arms and Armour, 1984. .
 Middlebrook, Martin. The Peenemünde Raid: The Night of 17–18 August 1943. New York: Bobbs-Merrill, 1982.
 Neufeld, Michael J. The Rocket and the Reich: Peenemünde and the Coming of the Ballistic Missile Era. New York: The Free Press, 1995.
 Otter, Patrick. Yorkshire Airfields Countryside Books (1998) 
 Overy. Richard. "The Means to Victory: Bombs and Bombing" in Overy, Why the Allies Won (1995), pp 101–33
 Peden, Murray. A Thousand Shall Fall. .
 
 Smith, Malcolm. "The Allied Air Offensive", Journal of Strategic Studies 13 (Mar 1990) 67–83
 Taylor, Frederick. (2005) Dresden: Tuesday, 13 February 1945. Bloomsbury. 
 Terraine, John. A Time for Courage: The Royal Air Force in the European War, 1939–1945 (1985)
 Tooze, Adam. The Wages of Destruction: The Making and Breaking of the Nazi Economy Penguin (2007) 
 Verrier, Anthony. The Bomber Offensive. London: Batsford, 1968.
 Webster, Charles and Noble Frankland, The Strategic Air Offensive Against Germany, 1939–1945 (HMSO, 1961 & facsimile reprinted by Naval & Military Press, 2006), 4 vols. .
 Wells, Mark K. Courage and air warfare: the Allied aircrew experience in the Second World War (1995)
 Werrell, Kenneth P. "The Strategic Bombing of Germany in World War II: Costs and Accomplishments", Journal of American History 73 (1986) 702–713; in JSTOR

External links
 Staff, RAF History – The Second World War A bibliography prepared by the RAF (see the section "Bomber Command and the Strategic Air Offensive against Germany")
 – Bob Baxter's Bomber Command Comprehensive history and research about Bomber Command.
 – Bomber Command Memorial Appeal The website looking to raise funds for the Bomber Command Memorial in London.
 – Bomber Command Memorial Appeal The donation website for the Bomber Command Memorial in London.
 Timelines of Bomber Command over '42–'45
 Related Newspaper Articles
 RAF Bomber Command at War 1939–45 CD audiobooks (actuality recordings)
 Bomber Command Squadrons
 

|-

Bomber Command
Bomber aircraft units and formations of the Royal Air Force
Bomber aircraft commands (military formations)
Military units and formations established in 1936
Military units and formations disestablished in 1968
Organisations based in Buckinghamshire
1936 establishments in the United Kingdom
1968 disestablishments in the United Kingdom